Cape Goldie is a cape at the south side of the mouth of Robb Glacier, overlooking the Ross Ice Shelf, Antarctica. It was discovered by the British National Antarctic Expedition (1901–04) and named for Sir George Taubman Goldie, a member of the committee which made the final draft of the instructions for the expedition.

References

Headlands of the Ross Dependency
Shackleton Coast